Funke Egbemode is a Nigerian female journalist,  Managing Director of the New Telegraph newspaper. She attended Baptist Practising Primary School, Iwo, Osun State.
Her Secondary school education was at Baptist Girls High School, Osogbo (Osun State)
She is a columnist with The Sun Newspaper.

Funke served as the President of Nigerian Guild of Editors for two terms. She is currently the Commissioner for Information and Orientation in Osun State, Nigeria.

References 

Year of birth missing (living people)
Living people
Nigerian women journalists